Dimitrie Cantemir Lyceum (Romanian: Liceul "Dimitrie Cantemir") of Chișinău, Moldova is a state institution of primary and secondary education. It is named after Dimitrie Cantemir, Moldavian voivod and prolific man of letters.

Previously the 3rd school of Chișinău, it was reformed into a lyceum in 1991. 

The language of education is Russian.

The lyceum consists of a grammar school (grades 1 to 4), a junior high school (or gym; grades 5 to 9), and a high school (or lyceum; grades 10 to 12).

Dimitrie Cantemir Lyceum of Chișinău is considered to be one of the best institutions of secondary education in Chișinău.

External links 

 Unofficial website of the lyceum 
 https://web.archive.org/web/20070710054906/http://www.iatp.md/LDK/

Education in Chișinău
Schools in Moldova